is a passenger railway station located in the city of Hanyū, Saitama, Japan, operated by the private railway operator Chichibu Railway.

Lines

Station layout
The station consists of a single island platform serving two tracks.

Platforms

Adjacent stations

History
Shingō Station opened on 1 April 1921.

Passenger statistics
In fiscal 2018, the station was used by an average of 301 passengers daily.

Surrounding area
 Hanyū Shingō No. 1 Elementary School

See also
 List of railway stations in Japan

References

External links

  

Stations of Chichibu Railway
Railway stations in Japan opened in 1921
Railway stations in Saitama Prefecture
Hanyū, Saitama